Austroaeschna inermis is a species of large dragonfly in the family Telephlebiidae, 
known as the whitewater darner. 
It inhabits fast-flowing mountain streams in southern New South Wales and eastern Victoria, Australia.

Austroaeschna inermis is a brown or black dragonfly with pale blue markings. It appears similar to the more widespread unicorn darner, Austroaeschna unicornis, which is found in eastern Australia, from Brisbane to Tasmania and around Adelaide in South Australia.

Gallery

See also
 List of dragonflies of Australia

References

Telephlebiidae
Odonata of Australia
Endemic fauna of Australia
Taxa named by René Martin
Insects described in 1901